The 2020 Southern Utah Thunderbirds football team represented Southern Utah University in the 2020–21 NCAA Division I FCS football season. They were led by fifth-year head coach Demario Warren and played their home games at Eccles Coliseum in Cedar City, Utah. They played as a member of the Big Sky Conference.

Previous season 

The Thunderbirds finished the 2019 season 3–9, 2–6 in Big Sky play to finish in a five-way tie for ninth place.

Preseason

Polls
On July 23, 2020, during the virtual Big Sky Kickoff, the Thunderbirds were predicted to finish twelfth in the Big Sky by both the coaches and media.

Schedule

References

Southern Utah
Southern Utah Thunderbirds football seasons
Southern Utah Thunderbirds football